St. Johannes Kirche was a former Lutheran church located at 217 East 119th Street between Second and Third Avenues in East Harlem, Manhattan, New York City. It was built in 1873 and reused as Iglesia Luterana Sion by the Lutheran Church in America: “An early masonry church for this community, then remote from the center of the city much further downtown. The church began as a home for a German-speaking congregation—today it serves those who speak Spanish.” It was demolished in 2007 and the lot has laid vacant for years.

References 

Churches in Manhattan
German-American culture in New York City
Hispanic and Latino American culture in New York City
Churches completed in 1873
19th-century Lutheran churches in the United States
Gothic Revival church buildings in New York City
Closed churches in New York City
Demolished churches in New York City
Demolished buildings and structures in Manhattan
Lutheran churches in New York City
East Harlem